Samantha Leigh Allen is an American journalist and author. Allen worked as a senior reporter for The Daily Beast and now works as a freelance journalist. In 2019 she published the nonfiction book Real Queer America: LGBT Stories From Red States.

Early life and education 
Allen was born in California and grew up in New Jersey. She was raised in a conservative, Mormon household. As a young adult she served as a Mormon missionary. She officially left the Church of Jesus Christ of Latter-day Saints in 2008 and transferred from Brigham Young University to Rutgers University later that year. She came out as a transgender woman in 2012.

She has a Ph.D. in Women's, Gender, and Sexuality Studies with a certificate in Psychoanalytic Studies from Emory University. She was a recipient of a George W. Woodruff Fellowship while at Emory. In 2013 she received the John Money Fellowship for Scholars of Sexology from the Kinsey Institute at Indiana University Bloomington. In 2014 she was a recipient of the Unsung Heroine Award from the Center for Women at Emory as well as a Transgender Advocate of the Year Award from Emory's Office of LGBT Life.

Career 
Allen covered LGBTQ stories as a senior reporter for The Daily Beast and worked as a staff writer for Fusion TV's Sex + Life vertical. She has written for The New York Times, Rolling Stone, Out, CNN, and Crosscut.com. Allen has also written for LGBTQ media outlets including Them and Logo TV's NewNowNext as a freelance writer. She also writes a travel newsletter called Get Lost on Substack and co-hosts a podcast about the WNBA called Double W with Laurel Powell.

In 2018 she received the GLAAD Media Award for Outstanding Digital Journalism Article for her article on the cultural erasure of bisexual men. In 2019 she was nominated for a GLAAD Award her piece on non-binary inclusion in the workplace. In 2018 Allen published Love & Estrogen with Amazon Original Stories, which is a biographical queer romantic comedy about meeting her wife at the Kinsey Institute.

In 2019 she published the biography Real Queer America: LGBT Stories From Red States, which won the Judy Turner Prize for Community Service at the Decatur Books Festival. Her book focuses on LGBTQ communities in Utah, Texas, Indiana, Tennessee, Georgia, and Mississippi.

Allen's first fiction novel, Patricia Wants to Cuddle, was published June 28, 2022 by Zando. It follows the final four contestants on a reality dating show as they encounter a creature named Patricia in the woods on a remote island.

References 

Living people
21st-century American journalists
21st-century American women writers
Brigham Young University alumni
Emory University alumni
Indiana University Bloomington alumni
Rutgers University alumni
Former Latter Day Saints
American magazine staff writers
American freelance journalists
American newspaper journalists
American online journalists
American women journalists
American women non-fiction writers
Journalists from California
American LGBT journalists
LGBT people from California
Transgender women
Year of birth missing (living people)
Female Mormon missionaries
Transgender writers